The 1966 Hualien earthquake occurred on March 13 at . The epicenter was located in the offshore area between Yonaguni Island, Japan and Hualien, Taiwan.

The intensity in Yonaguni reached shindo 5. Two people were reported dead in Yonaguni, Japan, and four in Taiwan. Building damage was reported.

This earthquake released a seismic moment of 4.86×1020 Nm. The magnitude of this earthquake was put at  8.0,  7.79,  7.8, or  7.8. This earthquake had a strike-slip faulting focal mechanism.

The fault plane solutions of this earthquake suggested that there is a sliver of crust off the east coast of Taiwan other than the Philippine Sea Plate. The map of shallow earthquakes shows that the Philippines are encircled by a zone of seismicity. There is a difference between the slip direction in the east coast of the Philippines and the relative motion between the Philippine Sea Plate and the Eurasian Plate. Together with other evidences, it has been  suggested that most of the Philippines might belong to a minor plate other than the Eurasian Plate.

See also 
List of earthquakes in 1966
List of earthquakes in Taiwan

References

External links 

Hualien Earthquake, 1966
Megathrust earthquakes in Taiwan
1966 tsunamis
1966 in Taiwan
Tsunamis in Taiwan